Sara Mohmand (born 8 January 1982) is a Pakistani badminton player.

Achievements

BWF International Challenge/Series
Women's Doubles

 BWF International Challenge tournament
 BWF International Series tournament
 BWF Future Series tournament

References

External links
 

Living people
1982 births
Pakistani female badminton players